Dorren O'Siochrú (born 1950) is an Irish chess player, Irish Women's Chess Championship four-times winner (1968, 1972, 1973, 1976).

Biography
In the early 1970s, Dorren O'Siochrú was one of Ireland's leading female chess players. She four times won Irish Women's Chess Championships: 1968, 1972, 1973, and 1976.

Dorren O'Siochrú played for Ireland in the Women's Chess Olympiads:
 In 1972, at first board in the 5th Chess Olympiad (women) in Skopje (+1, =4, -3),
 In 1974, at first board in the 6th Chess Olympiad (women) in Medellín (+2, =4, -4),
 In 1976, at second board in the 7th Chess Olympiad (women) in Haifa (+3, =6, -2).

References

External links

1950 births
Living people
Irish female chess players
Chess Olympiad competitors
20th-century chess players